The HOBET (Health Occupations Basic Entrance Test) is an entrance exam used in the United States to determine if a person is qualified to enter a health occupation worker. 

The HOBET covers the following topics:

Reading
 Paragraph and Passage Comprehension
 Informational Source Comprehension
Mathematics
 Numbers and Operation
 Algebraic Applications
 Data Interpretation
 Measurement
Science
 Human Body Science
 Life Science
 Earth and Physical Science
 Scientific Reasoning
English and Language Usage
 Grammar and Word Meanings in Context
 Spelling and Punctuation
 Structure

References 

Nursing in the United States
Standardized tests